Kanamala, commonly known by the name Pambavalley, is a village in Erumely panchayath in Kanjirappally tehsil of Kottayam district in the Indian state of Kerala. It is situated in the border of Kottayam and Pathanamthitta districts, but officially recorded as a part of Kottayam district only.

Etymology

The name Pambavalley derived from two words Pamba and valley, which denotes a place situated on the banks of holy Pamba river.

Economy 

Kanamala is a rural remote hilly area where rubber is the most cultivated crop. Many rubber plantations are located here. People also engages in small scale cultivation of pepper and tapioca.

Landmarks

Kanamala bridge 
There was a causeway linking Kottayam and Pathanamthitta Districts at Kanamala which was later replaced by the new bridge inaugurated on 23 December 2014, by Oomman Chandy. The construction cost of the bridge was  7.60 crore. The bridge here is an important landmark of Kanamala, which has two footpaths on either side. The bridge is a big relief for thousands of pilgrims and locals who earlier depended on the narrow causeway, which would often create traffic blocks and submerge in Pamba river during heavy rainfalls.

St.Mary's Clarist Convent
When Kanjirappally diocese came into being in 1977, the church authorities were quite aware of the need of having convents in its backward and not easily accessible hilly regions. Hence with great pleasure, Mar Joseph Powathil, the first Bishop of Kanjirappally granted permission to start an FC convent at Kanamala. Thus  St. Mary's Clarist Convent came into existence on 18 June 1978. The house was blessed by Mar Joseph Powathil. A tailoring centre for giving vocational training to the poor girls of the locality started functioning under the guidance of the sisters on 15 July 1978. A nursery school was also started in the same year considering the request of the people around. Now the sisters are active in teaching, parish service, and social welfare activities.
There is also a St. Thomas Church near to the convent which came into existence in 1956 under the Kanjirappally diocese.

Transport facilities 
Kanamala is connected by both state highway and rural roads. Both state-run and private buses operates there. Bus services are commonly from places like Mukkoottuthara, Erumely, Koruthodu, Mundakkayam, Changanassery and Kottayam. During Sabarimala pilgrimage, thousands of pilgrims passes through Kanamala via Neriyamangalam-Pamba state highway (SH-44).

Kanamala
During the Mandalam-Makaravilakku period, many fatal accidents took place at Kanamala causeway and Attivalavu spots. In the last five years, over 25 persons have died there. Kanamala had victimed several severe and minor accidents during the recent years.

Schools and Colleges
ST.Thomas U.P School, Kanamala
San Thome H.S.S, Kanamala
M.E.S College, Mukkoottuthara

Nearby places
 Thulappally
 Umikuppa
 Edakadathy
 Eruthuvapuzha
 Mookkenpetty
 Vattappara
 Mukkoottuthara
 Aarattukayam

References

Villages in Kottayam district